Louis Philippe Plateau is a plateau, about  long and  wide, which rises to  and occupies the central part of Trinity Peninsula, Antarctica, between Russell West Glacier and Windy Gap. This application of the name, recommended by the UK Antarctic Place-Names Committee in 1948, commemorates Captain Jules Dumont d'Urville's 1838 exploration of the Trinity Peninsula area, which he had named "Terre Louis Philippe," after Louis Philippe I, the King of France at the time.

Central plateaus of Graham Land
North to south:
 Laclavère Plateau
 Louis Philippe Plateau
 Detroit Plateau
 Herbert Plateau
 Foster Plateau
 Forbidden Plateau
 Bruce Plateau
 Avery Plateau
 Hemimont Plateau

References

Plateaus of Antarctica
Landforms of Graham Land
Landforms of Trinity Peninsula